Kevin M. Cotter (born September 26, 1977) is an American politician who represented the 99th District in the Michigan House of Representatives. He is a member of the Michigan Republican Party. He worked as an attorney in Mt. Pleasant before winning election to the state House in 2010. After serving as chair of the House Judiciary Committee and vice chair of the Elections and Ethics Committee, in November 2014 he was selected by the Republican caucus to serve as Speaker of the Michigan House of Representatives for the 2015-16 legislative session. On September 8, 2016, a federal lawsuit was filed against Representative Cotter (and numerous other defendants) by former State Representative Todd Courser.

Personal life
Cotter is a graduate of Shepherd High School and holds a bachelor's degree in Entrepreneurship and Business Administration, as well as a Master's of Science in Administration, both from Central Michigan University. He also earned a Juris Doctor degree from Western Michigan University Cooley Law School.

Electoral history

References

Businesspeople from Michigan
Central Michigan University alumni
Living people
Republican Party members of the Michigan House of Representatives
Michigan lawyers
People from Mount Pleasant, Michigan
Western Michigan University Cooley Law School alumni
21st-century American politicians
1977 births